Nils Bjørnflaten (born 24 January 1942) is a Norwegian politician.

He served as a deputy representative to the Norwegian Parliament from Telemark during the terms 1985–1989, representing the Labour Party. In 2005 he again became deputy representative, but in the meantime he had changed party to the Progress Party.

References

1942 births
Living people
Labour Party (Norway) politicians
Progress Party (Norway) politicians
Deputy members of the Storting